Acme is an unincorporated community in Kanawha County, West Virginia, United States.

References 

Unincorporated communities in West Virginia
Unincorporated communities in Kanawha County, West Virginia
Coal towns in West Virginia